Karachi Kops was a British documentary show that was broadcast on Channel 4 from 11 January 1994 to 8 February 1994
 It was a show about Pakistani police officers in Karachi.

References

1994 British television series debuts
1994 British television series endings
1990s British documentary television series
Channel 4 documentaries
Urdu-language television shows
Television shows set in Karachi
Documentary television series about policing
Law enforcement in Pakistan
English-language television shows